The German word Butterbrot (literally: butter bread = bread with butter) describes a slice of bread topped with butter. It is still considered Butterbrot even if additional toppings such as cheese, spreads, or lunch meats are added, as long as it consists of a slice of bread with butter.

The words in formal and colloquial German and the different dialects for butterbrot (different from belegtes Brot - with cheese, sausages etc.), simply Brot ("bread"), Butterstulle, Stulle, Schnitte (all three Low German/Berlinerisch dialect), Botteramm (Colognian dialect, cf. Dutch boterham), Bütterken (Lower Rhine dialect) to Bemme (Upper Saxon German) or Knifte (Ruhrdeutsch). Although it is increasingly replaced by other foods, it remains a common staple food in Germany. Since 1999, the last Friday in the month of September was made the Day of German Butterbrot by the Marketing Organization of German Agricultural Industries.

The Russian language adopted the term buterbrod from New High German (Butterbrot), perhaps as early as the 17th century during the reign of Peter the Great. In modern Russian the term has a more general meaning, whatever the ingredient on top of the slice of bread is. From Russian, the term buterbrod was adopted into Azerbaijani, Belarusian, Georgian, Kazakh, Ukrainian, and Lithuanian.

Comparison with sandwiches

A Butterbrot is commonly a single slice of bread and one ingredient on top of the butter or margarine. For breakfast, this ingredient tends to be sweet and can be marmalade, jam, honey, chocolate spread, hazelnut spread, or the less common peanut butter. For dinner or as boxed lunch, and often also for breakfast, the Butterbrot is eaten with something savoury on top, usually a large slice of cold meat or cheese or sliced German Wurst, or one of the countless cream cheese varieties, or even an entire Schnitzel or halved mince meat patty, or hard boiled egg slices or egg salad, or other spreadable creamy salads, or smoked salmon, or various savoury spreads like liverwurst, including also a wide range of vegetarian spreads. Boxed lunch Butterbrot can be folded for easier handling, and as such resembles the sandwich. In Austria Butterbrot only refers to a slice of bread with butter. If a topping is added it is named after the topping (e.g. Käsebrot "cheese bread", Wurstbrot "sausage bread").

The derivatives of the British sandwich and the Butterbrot of the German-speaking countries differ in some ways: The Butterbrot is usually made from the typical bread types of German-speaking countries, which are much firmer, juicier  and fuller in taste, and with a crispy crust, compared to English sandwich slices. One popular type is Vollkornbrot (wholegrain bread), which has a sourish full savoury taste, due to the use of sourdough as a leavening agent, and which often contains rye, albeit bread made from wheat flour is usually the most common variety. Vollkornbrot exists in dozens of varieties with respect to taste, shape, color, etc. However, Germans also know a large variety of white or mixed bread kinds, baguette or ciabatta are so common they are sold in every supermarket, and many modern German families simply eat toast with topping for breakfast, as it's cheaper and faster. Another very popular bread type is Brötchen (bread rolls), of which countless varieties exist in any possible shape, size and made from any possible flour combination.

Likely even more important are differences with respect to what is eaten on top of a Butterbrot or in a sandwich. Although exceptions exist, a Butterbrot is commonly not expanded the way sandwiches are. One slice of cheese and one or (in case of thin slices) maybe two slices of cold meat are commonly considered sufficient; adding lettuce, tomato, pickles, onions, mustard, mayonnaise etc. happens only following individual preferences. Also the ratio of bread and "topping" is relatively constant, thick fancy sandwich fillings have almost no equivalent for the Butterbrot.

German speakers differentiate between the German-style Butterbrot and the British-style sandwich by using the English word "sandwich" for the latter.

Present-day use
In German-speaking countries, the Butterbrot has been displaced gradually in the last 40 years by muesli, breakfast cereals or toast for breakfast and take-away bakery products during daytime.

Nonetheless, it remains a common staple food among many Germans. In addition it remains popular in the evening. It is also eaten a lot on hiking trips. In many parts of Germany the Butterbrot is still very common for second breakfast at school or work, much more common than, for example, fast food.

Usually in September every year, the Central Marketing Society for German Agriculture (CMA, the agricultural industry's now-defunct lobby group) used to declare a "day of the German Butterbrot". The 8th Butterbrot Day's motto in 2006 was "Re-Experience Enjoyment". The celebration was one of many "days of" and not very well known in Germany.

In Russia, Ukraine, Belarus, and other former Soviet republics, buterbrod has not experienced any decline and remains a common staple food. It is usually distinguished from sandwiches. In the Russian language, the term сэндвич (sandwich) has not been Russified to the same degree and has not been in use as long as buterbrod; usually, sandwich is only used for two slices of bread with some ingredient in between, especially sandwiches made in fastfood chains and restaurants.

Urban legends

Butterbrot is said to always fall to the floor (and especially on carpet) with the buttered side downwards; an example of Murphy's law. A common explanation is that the top side is usually heavier than the bottom side, particularly if the bread has additional toppings such as a spread. Another is tied to the common height of tables. The subject has been researched by various sources, including the German children's series Die Sendung mit der Maus, and the scientific German TV series Quarks & Co.

It is often joked about what would happen if Butterbrot is tied to the back of a cat, in the same manner that hypothetical buttered toast attached to the back of a cat is sometimes joked about, with it being debated whether the cat would still honour the popular axiom that a cat "always lands on its feet", or if the Butterbrot would be "stronger", making the cat fall on its back — alternatively, it is sometimes humorously suggested that the cat would simply levitate, as it would be unable to satisfy both criteria for landing.

See also

 List of butter dishes
 List of sandwiches
 Open sandwich

References

External links
German Food Guide: Das Butterbrot, The German Sandwich

Sourdough breads
Sandwiches
German cuisine
German sandwiches
Foods featuring butter